Ahindra Choudhury (1896-1974) was an Indian actor, director, theatre personality and the co-founder of Photo Play Syndicate, a Kolkata-based art organization for bioscope shows. A winner of the Sangeet Natak Akademi Award in 1958, Choudhury was honoured by the Government of India in 1963 with the award of Padma Shri, the fourth highest Indian civilian award, for his services to the nation.

Biography
Ahindra Choudhury was born on 6 August 1896 in Chakraberia, Kolkata in the Indian state of West Bengal. His early education was at Sishu Vidyalaya in Chakraberia and at London Missionary, Kolkata from where completed his studies in 1911. His entry into films started with the bioscope show company, Photo Play Synidicate, he founded together with Prafulla Ghosh in 1921. Two years later, he wrote the screenplay for the motionless feature film, Soul of a Slave directed by Hemchandra Mukherjee and was the lead actor.

His foray into movie world was in 1931 with Hrishir Prem, a Jyotish Bandopadhay film. He retired from acting with Shahjahan, a drama staged on 11 September 1957 at Minerva Theatre, Kolkata. Years later, he appeared in one more film, Shravan Sandhya, in 1974. He acted in 89 films, wrote screenplay for his maiden venture, Soul of a Slave and directed two films.

Choudhury received the Sangeet Natak Akademi award in 1958. The Government of India honoured him with the civilian award of Padma Shri in 1963. He was a recipient of DLitt (Honoris Causa) from the Rabindra Bharati University and was a guest Lecturer at the University of Kolkata. He died on 4 November 1974, at the age of 80.

Filmography

As an actor

As a Director
 Krishna Sakha (1927)
 Vipranarayana (1937)

As a story writer
 Soul of a Slave (1923)

See also

 Rabindra Bharati University 
 University of Kolkata

References

Further reading

External links
 
 

Recipients of the Padma Shri in literature & education
1896 births
1974 deaths
People from Kolkata district
Indian male film actors
Indian male screenwriters
Hindi-language film directors
Recipients of the Sangeet Natak Akademi Award
20th-century Indian film directors
20th-century Indian male actors
Male actors from Kolkata
Film directors from Kolkata
Indian male silent film actors
20th-century Indian screenwriters
20th-century Indian male writers